Olaine Municipality is a municipality in Latvia. The municipality was formed in 2009 by merging Olaine parish and Olaine town the administrative centre being Olaine. The population in 2020 was 19,667.

Twin towns — sister cities

Olaine is twinned with:

 Karlskoga, Sweden
 Nowa Sarzyna, Poland
 Ödeshög, Sweden
 Riihimäki, Finland
 Vadstena, Sweden

Images

See also
Administrative divisions of Latvia (2009)

References

 
Municipalities of Latvia